Unstoppable. My Life So Far  is a memoir written by  professional tennis player  Maria Sharapova published on September 12, 2017.

Summary
Maria Sharapova is a famous Russian tennis player, a five-time winner of Grand Slam tournaments. She started her career at the age of four, and already at 17 she became truly famous, defeating Serena Williams in the final of the Wimbledon tournament.

Sharapova's candid book about herself, people close to her, victories and failures not only on the court, but also in life. Part of the book is devoted to the 15-month disqualification of the athlete for the use of prohibited substances.

Reception
One of The Boston Globe's Best Books of 2017. In October 2017, the book took 2nd place in the New York Times monthly Sports Bestseller ranking.

References

External links
 Book Review. Unstoppable My Life So Far By Maria Sharapova

Sports autobiographies
Tennis books
2017 non-fiction books
2017 in tennis
Sarah Crichton Books books